Vlada Kharkova (born 29 September 1996) is a Ukrainian right-handed épée fencer and 2022 individual European champion.

Medal Record

European Championship

References

External links 
 

Living people
1996 births
Place of birth missing (living people)
Ukrainian female épée fencers
21st-century Ukrainian women